Angel is an American sitcom that aired on CBS during the 1960–1961 television season. The series was created and executive produced by Jess Oppenheimer, and stars Annie Fargé as the title character.

Synopsis
Angelique "Angel" Smith, a pretty, young, scatterbrained Frenchwoman, comes to the United States and marries a young architect, John Smith. With her distinct French accent, Angel gets into various problems with the culture, language, and procedures in her new country.

Background 
Although it had much less slapstick comedy, Angel was somewhat akin to two other CBS sitcoms, I Love Lucy (already concluded) and Pete and Gladys, a spin-off of CBS's December Bride. The series co-starred Doris Singleton as Angel's sympathetic friend Susie and Don Keefer as Susie's husband George, roughly akin to the Ethel and Fred roles from I Love Lucy.

Co-sponsored by General Foods (Post Cereals) and Johnson's Wax, Angel was initially broadcast at 9 pm Eastern on Thursday evenings between October 6, 1960, and April 13, 1961. On April 19, it moved to Wednesdays in the same time slot for the remaining first-run episodes, and then summer reruns.

Reception and cancellation
Earlier, Time had commented that Fargé "triumphantly resists being merely Lucille Ball with a French accent. She is easily the brightest newcomer to situation comedy—small, pert, winsome, and somehow giving the impression of being attractively feathered." Despite the good personal reviews, Fargé left U.S. television within a few years for a career in France, where she was often credited as "Annie Fargue".

Guest stars

Denise Alexander
Madge Blake
Mel Blanc
Bobby Diamond
Ross Elliott
Stuart Erwin
James Garner
Ned Glass
Gale Gordon
Jonathan Hole
Dennis Holmes
Lamont Johnson

Joseph Kearns
Tommy Kirk
Dayton Lummis
Howard McNear
Don Megowan
Stafford Repp
Hanley Stafford
Lyle Talbot
Minerva Urecal
Herb Vigran
Jesse White
Mary Wickes
Frank Wilcox

Episode list

References

External links

 
 Angel on YouTube

1960 American television series debuts
1961 American television series endings
1960s American sitcoms
Black-and-white American television shows
CBS original programming
English-language television shows
Television series by CBS Studios